Mutzig ( or) is a commune in the Bas-Rhin department in Grand Est, in north-eastern France. The commune of Mutzig is located at the entrance of the Bruche river valley, on the Route des Vins d'Alsace.

History
Evidences of human activities can be traced back to the Paleolithic era with the recent discovery of Neanderthal artifacts. The town Mutzig was first mentioned in the 10th century. It became part of the Prince-Bishopric of Strasbourg in 1308.

In the 19th century, several industries were established in Mutzig among which a weapon manufactory on the grounds of the former castle of the Cardinal de Rohan. In 1893, when Alsace was part of the German Empire, Kaiser Wilhelm II ordered the construction of a fort, the Feste Kaiser Wilhelm II, north of the town, as well as military barracks to defend Strasbourg against a potential French invasion.

Population

Gallery

See also
 Communes of the Bas-Rhin department

References

External links

 Mutzig fort website
 Route des Vins d'Alsace

Communes of Bas-Rhin
Bas-Rhin communes articles needing translation from French Wikipedia